Arne Alf Robert Robertsson (23 March 1942 – 29 January 1991) was a Swedish heavyweight wrestler who won a bronze medal in Greco-Roman wrestling at the 1977 World Championships. He competed at the 1964 and 1968 Olympics in freestyle and at the 1976 Games in Greco-Roman wrestling, but was eliminated after two rounds on all occasions. At the European championships Robertsson won a silver medal in Greco-Roman and freestyle wrestling each.

References

1942 births
1991 deaths
Olympic wrestlers of Sweden
Wrestlers at the 1964 Summer Olympics
Wrestlers at the 1968 Summer Olympics
Wrestlers at the 1976 Summer Olympics
Swedish male sport wrestlers
World Wrestling Championships medalists
European Wrestling Championships medalists
People from Lidköping Municipality
Sportspeople from Västra Götaland County
20th-century Swedish people